Buchwieser is a German surname. Notable people with the surname include:

, Austrian architect
Cathinka Buchwieser (1789–1828), German soprano and actress
Martin Buchwieser (born 1989), German ice hockey player

German-language surnames